Keith Howlett is a retired British boxer.

Boxing career
Howlett was twice National Champion when boxing for the Army. In 1988 and 1989 he won the prestigious ABA bantamweight championship.

He represented England in the -54 kg bantamweight division, at the 1990 Commonwealth Games in Auckland, New Zealand.

References

Living people
British male boxers
Boxers at the 1990 Commonwealth Games
Year of birth missing (living people)
Bantamweight boxers
Commonwealth Games competitors for England